Bolenol, also known as 17α-ethyl-19-norandrost-5-en-17β-ol (ethylnorandrostenol), is a synthetic, orally active anabolic-androgenic steroid (AAS) and a 17α-alkylated derivative of 19-nortestosterone (nandrolone) that was never marketed. It was described in the literature in 1969.

See also
 Bolandiol
 Methandriol
 Propetandrol
 Penmesterol

References

1-Ethylcyclopentanols
Androgens and anabolic steroids
Estranes
Hepatotoxins